Raffaello Bonusi (born 31 January 1992 in Gavardo) is an Italian former cyclist, who rode professionally for UCI Professional Continental team  in 2017 and 2018.

Major results

2010
 1st Trofeo Città Di Ivrea
 8th Gran Premio dell'Arno
2013
 10th Giro del Medio Brenta
2014
 9th Trofeo Città di San Vendemiano
2015
 7th Coppa della Pace
2016
 1st  Overall Tour of China I
1st Stage 3
2017
 1st Stage 1 Vuelta al Táchira
 10th Overall Tour of China II

References

External links

1992 births
Living people
Italian male cyclists
Cyclists from the Province of Brescia